Kimi Ohashi (29 January 1905 – 1 June 1999) was a Japanese politician. She was one of the first group of women elected to the House of Representatives in 1946.

Biography
Ohashi was born in Kanuma in 1905. Following her marriage, she moved to Nobeoka in Miyazaki Prefecture, but returned to Kanuma after her husband's death, becoming a teacher at Tochigi Prefectural Kanuma High School.

After World War II, Ohashi contested the Miyazaki district in the 1946 general elections as a Hyuga Democratic Party candidate, and was elected to the House of Representatives. Following the elections she joined the National Cooperative Party.

Ohashi later became a member of Soka Gakkai. She died in 1999 at the age of 94.

References

1905 births
People from Kanuma, Tochigi
Japanese schoolteachers
20th-century Japanese women politicians
20th-century Japanese politicians
Members of the House of Representatives (Japan)
National Cooperative Party politicians
Democratic Party (Japan, 1947) politicians
1999 deaths